Ba Prefecture may refer to:

Bā Prefecture (巴州), a prefecture between the 6th and 20th centuries in modern Sichuan, China
Bà Prefecture (霸州), a prefecture between the 10th and 20th centuries in modern Hebei, China

See also
Bayingolin Mongol Autonomous Prefecture, a prefecture in Xinjiang, China, sometimes abbreviated as Ba Prefecture
Bazhou (disambiguation)
Ba (disambiguation)